There are two communities in the U.S. state of Virginia named Frog Level:
Frog Level, Tazewell County, Virginia, a community in Southwest Virginia near the town of Tazewell
Frog Level, Caroline County, Virginia, a community in eastern Virginia in southern Caroline County

See also
Frog Level (disambiguation)